Willie Donnelly was an Irish hurler. His championship career with the Cork senior team lasted from 1927 to 1929.

Donnelly first played competitive hurling with the Collins club. He later joined the Blackrock club with whom he won three county championship medals.

Donnelly made his senior inter-county debut during the 1927 championship. He was a regular member of the team over the course of the following three seasons, winning back-to-back All-Ireland medals. Donnelly also won three Munster medals.

Honours

Blackrock
Cork Senior Hurling Championship (1): 1929, 1930, 1931

Cork
All-Ireland Senior Hurling Championship (2): 1928, 1929
Munster Senior Hurling Championship (3): 1927, 1928, 1929

References

Collins hurlers
Blackrock National Hurling Club hurlers
Cork inter-county hurlers
Year of birth missing
Year of death missing